KNL1 (kinetochore scaffold 1, aka CASC5) is a protein that is encoded by the KNL1 gene in humans.

Function 
KNL1 is part of the outer kinetochore. It is a part of KMN network of proteins together with MIS12, and NDC80.

KNL1 is involved in microtubule attachment to chromosome centromeres and in the activation of the spindle checkpoint during mitosis. The CASC5 gene is upregulated in the areas of cell proliferation surrounding the ventricles during fetal brain development.

Interactions 

CASC5 has been shown to interact with MIS12, BUB1, BUBR1 and ZWINT-1.

Polymorphisms
Homozygous polymorphisms in the CASC5 gene have been seen in patients with autosomal recessive primary microcephaly (MCPH). The mutation resulted in the skipping of exon 18 transcription, causing a frameshift and the production of a truncated protein. This truncation inhibits the binding ability of MIS12.

References

External links

Further reading